Greeks bearing gifts may refer to:

The prophecy of Laocoön, priest of Troy, who in Virgil's Aeneid, tells his countrymen to "Beware of Greeks bearing gifts"
The mythological Trojan Horse which Laocoön foresees
"looking a Trojan horse in the mouth", the 1982 scene in the British sitcom Yes, Minister
"Greeks Bearing Gifts", a 1991 episode of Inspector Morse
"Greeks Bearing Gifts" (Torchwood), a 2006 episode of the science-fiction television programme Torchwood
Greeks Bearing Gifts, a 2018 novel by Philip Kerr